Anolis laeviventris, the white anole, is a species of lizard in the family Dactyloidae. The species is found in Mexico, Guatemala, Honduras, Nicaragua, and Costa Rica.

References

Anoles
Reptiles described in 1834
Taxa named by Arend Friedrich August Wiegmann